Chamra Linda is an Indian politician from the Bishunpur block. He is the state legislative assembly member from Bishunpur 2019.

References

Living people
21st-century Indian politicians
Lok Sabha members from Jharkhand
People from Ranchi district
Date of birth missing (living people)
Place of birth missing (living people)
Year of birth missing (living people)